State Route 139 (SR 139) is a north–south road that stretches from New Boston at its southern terminus to Jackson, Ohio at its northern terminus.  This route offers a quick, yet narrow and sharp route to Jackson.  US 23 and SR 32 offer a more straight route with a higher speed limit, though less direct.

SR 139 begins at an intersection with US 52 in New Boston. The route goes north through a couple of traffic lights before passing through Portsmouth, Eden Park, Twin Valley, Rubyville, and Clarktown before it continues due east toward Minford. From there it crosses SR 335 and then begins to turn north once again. After reaching the Scioto County and Jackson County line, SR 279 splits off of State Route 139 and heads toward Oak Hill. SR 139 crosses SR 32 just outside Jackson and SR 776 within less than mile of downtown.

History
SR 139 was first designated in 1923 along the New Boston–Jackson route it has always followed. SR 139 fully replaced SR 402 which had been in existence since the creation of the state highway system in 1912. No major changes have occurred to SR 139's routing since it was first designated.

Major intersections

References

139
Transportation in Scioto County, Ohio
Transportation in Jackson County, Ohio